Stephanie Venier (born 19 December 1993) is an Austrian World Cup alpine ski racer, and specializes in the speed events of downhill and super-G.

Born in Innsbruck, Tyrol, Venier made her World Cup debut at age 19 in January 2013. She gained her first podium in January 2017 in a super-G at Garmisch, Germany; several weeks later at the World Championships, she won the silver medal in the downhill.

World Cup results

Season standings
{| class=wikitable style="text-align:center"
!Season !!  Age  !! Overall !!  Slalom  !! Giant Slalom  !! Super G !! Downhill !!Combined
|-
| 2013 ||19|| 117 || — || — || 49 || — || —
|-
| 2014 ||20|| 98 || — || — || 42 || — || 27
|-
| 2015 ||21|| 101 || — || — || 46 || 42 || —
|-
| 2016 ||22|| 46 || — || — || 17 || 30 || 39 
|-
| 2017 ||23|| 16 || — || — ||5 || 12|| 28
|-
| 2018 ||24|| 27 || — || — ||19 || 13|| 29
|-
| 2019 ||25|| 9 || — || — ||9 ||bgcolor="silver"|2|| —
|-
| 2020 ||26|| 14 || — || — ||5 || 7|| —
|-
| 2021 ||27|| 44 || — || — ||22 || 21 || rowspan="3" 
|-
| 2022 ||28||46||— ||—||35|| 22
|-
| 2023 ||29||29||—||—||10||22|}

Race podiums
 1 win – (1 DH)
 7 podiums – (4 DH, 3 SG); 36 top tens

World Championship results

Olympic results

References

External links

 
Austrian Ski team – official site – Stephanie Venier – Atomic Skis – athletes – Stephanie Venier
 – ''

1993 births
Austrian female alpine skiers
Sportspeople from Innsbruck
Living people
Alpine skiers at the 2018 Winter Olympics
Olympic alpine skiers of Austria
20th-century Austrian women
21st-century Austrian women